IPH may refer to:

Airport 
 Sultan Azlan Shah Airport

Institutes 
 Institute of Public Health (Bangladesh)
 Addis Continental Institute of Public Health
 Institut für Integrierte Produktion Hannover

Companies 
 Iowa Pacific Holdings
 Islamic Publishing House

Chemical compounds 
 Isopropylphenidate

Medical conditions 
 Idiopathic pulmonary haemosiderosis
 Intraparenchymal hemorrage
 Inflammatory papillary hyperplasia